Mycobacterium conceptionense is a non pigmented rapidly growing mycobacterium was first isolated from wound liquid outflow, bone tissue biopsy, and excised skin tissue from a 31-year-old woman who suffered an accidental open right tibia fracture and prolonged stay in a river. Etymology: conceptionense, pertaining to Hôpital de la Conception, the hospital where the first strain was isolated.

Description
Microscopy
Acid-fast and gram-positive bacilli.

Colony characteristics
Colonies are non pigmented.

Physiology
Colonies appear on 5% sheep blood agar, Middlebrook 7H10 agar, and egg-based Lowenstein-Jensen slants in 2 to 5
days at temperatures between 25 and 37 °C, optimally at 30 °C.  No growth occurs at 42 °C.
The type strain is susceptible in vitro to imipenem, minocycline, doxycycline, clarithromycin, erythromycin, azithromycin, amikacin, ciprofloxacin, ofloxacin, sparfloxacin, and amoxicillinclavulanate and resistant to penicillin, amoxicillin, and vancomycin.

Differential characteristics
M. conceptionense shares 99.7% 16S rRNA (4-bp difference) and 97.0% rpoB gene sequence similarity with Mycobacterium porcinum, the nearest species.

Pathogenesis
This species is associated with post traumatic osteitis.

Type strain
Strain D16 = CCUG 50187 = CIP 108544

References

Adékambi,T., et al. 2006. Description of Mycobacterium conceptionense sp. nov., a Mycobacterium fortuitum group organism isolated from a posttraumatic osteitis inflammation. J. Clin. Microbiol., 44, 1268–1273.

External links
Type strain of Mycobacterium conceptionense at BacDive -  the Bacterial Diversity Metadatabase

Acid-fast bacilli
conceptionense
Bacteria described in 2006